The 2009 South American Under-15 Football Championship was the fourth South American Under-15 Football Championship, the championship for men's under-15 national association football teams in CONMEBOL. It took place in Bolivia for the second time from 6 November to 22 November 2011.

Teams

 (hosts)
 (holders)

Venues
Four stadiums in four host cities were chosen for the tournament:

Officials
On 7 October 2009, CONMEBOL's Commission on Referees announced the list of 10 referees and assistant to be used for the tournament.

Officials
 Federico Beligoy
 Raúl Orosco
 Ricardo Márquez
 Claudio Puga
 Imer Machado
 Omar Ponce
 Julio Quintana
 Héctor Pacheco
 Darío Ubríaco
 Marlon Escalante

Assistants
 Ariel Bustos
 Efraín Castro
 Marcelo Van Gasse
 Julio Díaz Pardo
 Wilmar Navarro
 Christian Lescano
 Melciades Saldivar
 Jonny Bossio
 William Casavieja
 Jorge Urrego

First round
The 10 national teams were divided in 2 groups of 5 teams each. The top 2 teams in each group qualified for the final round.

Group A

Group B

Final round
The final round was played in a round robin system between the four best teams.

References

External links
CONMEBOL official website

Under
2009 in Bolivian football
2009
2009
2009 in youth association football